Acronicta tota is a moth of the family Noctuidae. It is found in North America, including Texas.

External links
Image

tota
Moths of North America
Moths described in 1879